Megatritheca is a genus of flowering plants belonging to the family Malvaceae.

Its native range is West-Central Tropical Africa.

Species
Species:

Megatritheca devredii 
Megatritheca grossedenticulata

References

Byttnerioideae
Malvaceae genera